Narsimh Bhandari (20 June 1934 – 17 November 2017) was an Indian cricketer. He played in seven first-class matches between 1959 and 1961, scoring a century on debut for Bihar cricket team. He also played for East Zone cricket team in the 1961–62 Duleep Trophy.

See also
 List of East Zone cricketers

References

External links
 

1934 births
2017 deaths
Indian cricketers
Bihar cricketers
East Zone cricketers
Place of birth missing